Henry Barr (March 21, 1844 – July 21, 1926) was an Ontario farmer and political figure. He represented Renfrew North in the Legislative Assembly of Ontario from 1892 to 1898 as a Liberal member.

He was born in Horton Township, Renfrew County, Canada West in 1844, the son of David Barr. In 1865, he married Emily Cole. Barr was defeated by Arunah Dunlop in 1891 but won the by-election that followed in 1892. He lived near Douglas. He died at Renfrew County in 1926.

References

External links 
The Canadian parliamentary companion, 1897 JA Gemmill
 

1844 births
Ontario Liberal Party MPPs
1926 deaths